João Victor Teixeira de Souza Silva (born 26 March 1994) is a Brazilian para-athlete, who won bronze in the shot put F37 event at the 2020 Summer Paralympics.

References

1994 births
Living people
Brazilian male shot putters
Paralympic athletes of Brazil
Paralympic bronze medalists for Brazil
Athletes (track and field) at the 2020 Summer Paralympics
Medalists at the 2020 Summer Paralympics
Paralympic medalists in athletics (track and field)
Sportspeople from Rio de Janeiro (city)
Brazilian male discus throwers
21st-century Brazilian people